Mersin Olympic Swimming Pool is a complex of swimming pools in Mersin, Turkey.

Geography
Both Macit Özcan Sports Complex and Nevin Yanıt Athletics Complex are situated  within  of the pool complex.

Description
The complex was built on a  ground area. There are three pools in the complex: an Olympic-size swimming pool with a spectator capacity of 1000 and two smaller pools for practice.

2013 Mediterranean Games
At the 2013 Mediterranean Games, the pool hosted swimming and paralympics swimming events between 21 and 25 June 2013.

References

External links
Images

Sports venues in Mersin
Swimming venues in Turkey
2013 Mediterranean Games venues
Yenişehir, Mersin
Sports venues completed in 2013